Francis James Alexander (15 April 1911 – 19 June 2005) was an Australian cricketer. He appeared in 13 first-class matches for Western Australia between 1932 and 1938, scoring 391 at an average of 16.29, with a highest score of 48.

References

External links

1911 births
2005 deaths
Australian cricketers
Western Australia cricketers
Cricketers from Perth, Western Australia
Sportsmen from Western Australia